Epidendrum peperomia, the peperomia-like epidendrum, is a species of orchid in the genus Epidendrum.

peperomia